Misato Town General Gymnasium Lirios (美郷町総合体育館リリオス) is an indoor sporting arena located in Misato, Akita, Japan.  It hosts indoor sporting events such as basketball,  volleyball and table tennis. It hosted National Sports Festival of Japan badminton games in 2007.

Misato Town Minami Gymnasium (美郷町南体育館) is located within walking distance of Lirios.

Facilities
Main arena - 
Conference room
Shower rooms
Fitness room

References 

Badminton venues
Sports venues in Akita Prefecture
Indoor arenas in Japan
Basketball venues in Japan
Misato, Akita